Kurt Rey (born 27 July 1937) is a Swiss former sports shooter. He competed in the 25 metre pistol event at the 1972 Summer Olympics.

References

1937 births
Living people
Swiss male sport shooters
Olympic shooters of Switzerland
Shooters at the 1972 Summer Olympics
Place of birth missing (living people)